Digital Addressable Lighting Interface (DALI) is a trademark for network-based products that control lighting. The underlying technology was established by a consortium of lighting equipment manufacturers as a successor for 1-10 V/ lighting control systems, and as an open standard alternative to several proprietary protocols. The DALI, DALI-2 and D4i trademarks are owned by the lighting industry alliance, DiiA (Digital Illumination Interface Alliance).

DALI is specified by a series of technical standards in IEC 62386. Standards conformance ensures that equipment from different manufacturers will interoperate. The DALI trademark is allowed on devices that comply with the DiiA testing and certification requirements, and are listed as either registered (DALI version-1) or certified (DALI-2) on the DiiA website. D4i certification  - an extension of DALI-2 - was added by DiiA in November 2019.

Members of the AG DALI were allowed to use the DALI trademark until the DALI working party was dissolved on 30 March 2017, when trademark use was transferred to DiiA members. Since 9 June 2017, Digital Illumination Interface Alliance (DiiA) certifies DALI products. DiiA is a Partner Program of IEEE-ISTO.

Technical overview
A DALI network consists of at least one application controller and bus power supply (which may be built into any of the products) as well as input devices (e.g. sensors and push-buttons), control gear (e.g., electrical ballasts, LED drivers and dimmers) with DALI interfaces. Application controllers can control, configure or query each device by means of a bi-directional data exchange. Unlike DMX, multiple controllers can co-exist on the bus. The DALI protocol permits addressing devices individually, in groups or via broadcast.  Scenes can be stored in the devices, for recall on an individual, group or broadcast basis.  Groups and scenes are used to insure simultaneous execution of level changes, since each packet requires about 25 ms - or 1.5 seconds if all 64 addresses were to change level.

Each device is assigned a unique short address between 0 and 63, making up to 64 devices possible in a basic system. Address assignment is performed over the bus using a "commissioning" protocol built into the DALI controller, usually after all hardware is installed, or successively as devices are added.   The Device Address is commonly a LED driver with one or many LEDs sharing the same level.   A DT6 driver is for single color temperature applications, a DT8 driver is used for CCT color tuning, or RGBWW multi color applications - for example a strip where all the "pixels" have the same color. 

Collision detection is used to allow multiple transmitters on the bus.

A single pair of wires comprises the bus used for communication on a DALI network. The network can be arranged in bus or star topology, or a combination of these.  Each device on a DALI network can be addressed individually, unlike DSI and 0–10V devices. Consequently, DALI networks typically use fewer wires than DSI or 0–10V systems.

The bus is used for both signal and bus power.  A power supply provides a current limited source of up to 250 mA at typically 16 V DC; each device may draw up to 2 mA unless bus-powered.  While many devices are mains-powered (line-powered), low-power devices such as motion detectors may be powered directly from the DALI bus.  Each device has a bridge rectifier on its input so it is polarity-insensitive.  The bus is a wired-AND configuration where signals are sent by briefly shorting the bus to a low voltage level.  (The power supply is required to tolerate this, limiting the current to 250 mA.)

Although the DALI control cable operates at ELV potential, it is not classified as SELV (Safety Extra Low Voltage) and must be treated as if it has only basic insulation from mains.  This has the disadvantage that the network cable is required to be mains-rated, but has the advantage that it may be run next to mains cables or within a multi-core cable which includes mains power.  Also, mains-powered devices (e.g., LED drivers) need only provide functional insulation between the mains and the DALI control wires.

The network cable is required to provide a maximum drop of  along the cable. At 250 mA of supply current, that requires a resistance of ≤  per wire.

(This also allows plenty of headroom for a bridge rectifier in each slave.)

Each bit is sent using Manchester encoding (a "1" bit is low for the first half of the bit time, and high for the second, while "0" is the reverse), so that power is present for half of each bit.  When the bus is idle, the voltage level is continuously high (which is not the same as a data bit).  Frames begin with a "1" start bit, then 8 to 32 data bits in msbit-first order (standard RS-232 is lsbit-first), followed by a minimum of 2.45 ms of idle.

Device addressing
A DALI device, such as an LED driver, can be controlled individually via its short address. Additionally, DALI devices may be arranged into groups in which all devices of the same group can respond to the commands addressed to the group. For example, a room with 4 ballasts can be changed from off to on in three common ways:

Single device
Using the Short Address, e.g. sending the following DALI messages:

 DALI Short Address 1 go to 100%
 DALI Short Address 2 go to 100%
 DALI Short Address 3 go to 100%
 DALI Short Address 4 go to 100%

This method has the advantage of not requiring programming of group and scene information for each ballast. The fade time of the transition can be chosen on the fly.
This method may be undesirable because simultaneous control of a large number of devices may not be possible due to network latency and the comparatively slow data rate of DALI. For example, turning all lighting fixtures off may result in a visible delay between the first and last ballasts switching off. This issue is normally not a problem in rooms with a smaller number of ballasts.

Device groups
Using the DALI Group previously defined for the ballasts in the room, if Short Address 1, 2, 3 and 4 are members of Group 1, e.g.: 
 DALI Group address 1 go to 100%

This method has the advantage of being immune to synchronization effects as described above.
This method has the disadvantage of requiring each ballast to be programmed with the required group numbers and scene information. The fade time can still be configured on the fly, if required.

Broadcast
Using the DALI Broadcast command, all control gear will change to that level, e.g.:
 DALI Broadcast go to 50%

Brightness control
DALI lighting levels are specified by an 8-bit value, with 0 representing off, 1 means 0.1% of full brightness, 254 means full brightness, and other values being logarithmically interpolated, giving a 2.77% increase per step.

(A value of 255 is reserved for freezing the current lighting level without changing it.)

This is designed to match human eye sensitivity so that perceived brightness steps are uniform, and to ensure corresponding brightness levels in units from different manufacturers.

Scenes
Devices store 16 programmable output levels as "scenes".  A single broadcast command causes each device to change to its configured level, e.g. dim lights over the audience and bright lights over the stage.  (A programmed output level of 255 causes a device not to respond to a given scene.)

A 17th "system failure" scene is triggered by a loss of power (sustained low level) on the DALI bus, to provide a safe fallback if control is lost.

Commands for control gear
Forward frames sent to control gear are 16 bits long, comprising an address byte followed by an opcode byte.  The address byte specifies a target device or a special command addressed to all devices.

Except for special commands, when addressing a device, the 7 most significant bits is the device address.  The least significant bit of the address byte specifies the interpretation of the opcode byte, with "0" meaning that the opcode is a light level ( ARC ) , and "1" meaning that the opcode is a command.

Multi packet commands are used for more complex tasks - like setting RGB colors.  These commands use three "data transfer registers"  (DTR, DTR1, DTR2 ) which can be read and written or used as a parameter by subsequent commands.  For example, copy the current ARC level to DTR, save DTR as a scene.  Evidently, the DTR value can be different in different devices.

Address byte format:
 0AAA AAAS: Target device 0 ≤ A < 64.
 100A AAAS: Target group 0 ≤ A < 16.  Each control gear may be a member of any or all groups.
 1111 110S: Broadcast unaddressed
 1111 111S: Broadcast
 1010 0000 to 1100 1011: Special commands
 1100 1100 to 1111 1011: Reserved

Common control gear commands:

Commands for control devices
The DALI-2 standard  added standardisation of control devices. Control devices can include input devices such as daylight sensors, passive infrared room occupancy sensors, and manual lighting controls, or they can be application controllers that are the "brains" of the system - using information to make decisions and control the lights and other devices. Control devices can also combine the functionality of an application controller and an input device. Control devices use 24-bit forward frames, which are ignored by control gear, so up to 64 control devices may share the bus with up to 64 control gear.

D4i
DiiA published several new specifications in 2018 and 2019, extending DALI-2 functionality with power and data, especially for intra-luminaire DALI systems. Applications include indoor and outdoor luminaires, and small DALI systems. The D4i trademark is used on certified products to indicate that these new features are included in the products.

Colour control (DT8)
IEC 62386-209 describes colour control gear. This describes several colour types - methods of controlling colour. The most popular of these is Tc (tunable white), and was added to DALI-2 certification in January 2020.

Emergency lighting
IEC 62386-202 describes self-contained emergency lighting. Features include automated triggering of function tests and duration tests, and recording of results. These devices are currently included in DALI version-1 registration, with tests for DALI-2 certification in development. Such DALI version-1 products can be mixed with DALI-2 products in the same system, with no problems expected.

Wireless
IEC 62386-104 describes several wireless and wired transport alternatives to the conventional wired DALI bus system. DiiA is working with other industry associations to enable certification of DALI-2 products that operate over certain underlying wireless carriers. 
It is also possible to combine DALI with wireless communication via application gateways that translate between DALI and the wireless protocol of choice. While such gateways are not standardized, DiiA is working with other industry associations to develop the necessary specifications and tests to achieve this. DiiA: DALI and Wireless

See also
 Dimmer
 Lighting control console
 Lighting control system

References

External links 
 Digital Illumination Interface Alliance

Building automation
Lighting
Open standards